Saint Mary's Catholic Cemetery is a historic cemetery and national historic district located at Norfolk, Virginia. It encompasses six contributing structures and one contributing object in cemetery established in 1854 to serve the Roman Catholic communities of Norfolk, Virginia Beach, and Chesapeake. The cemetery was established by the pastor of St. Mary's Church of Norfolk.  Notable features include the large bronze crucifix erected around 1922 in honor of Catholic servicemen who served in World War I and six family mausoleums.

It was listed on the National Register of Historic Places in 2001.

References

External links
 

1854 establishments in Virginia
Cemeteries on the National Register of Historic Places in Virginia
Historic districts on the National Register of Historic Places in Virginia
Buildings and structures in Norfolk, Virginia
National Register of Historic Places in Norfolk, Virginia